Singapore competed at the 1996 Summer Paralympics in Atlanta, United States. Three competitors from Singapore competed in a total of two sports (athletics and cycling), and did not place in the medal table.

Disability classifications

Every participant at the Paralympics has their disability grouped into one of five disability categories; amputation, the condition may be congenital or sustained through injury or illness; cerebral palsy; wheelchair athletes, there is often overlap between this and other categories; visual impairment, including blindness; Les autres, any physical disability that does not fall strictly under one of the other categories, for example dwarfism or multiple sclerosis. Each Paralympic sport then has its own classifications, dependent upon the specific physical demands of competition. Events are given a code, made of numbers and letters, describing the type of event and classification of the athletes competing. Some sports, such as athletics, divide athletes by both the category and severity of their disabilities, other sports, for example swimming, group competitors from different categories together, the only separation being based on the severity of the disability.

Athletics

Cycling

See also
Singapore at the Paralympics
Singapore at the 1996 Summer Olympics

References 

Nations at the 1996 Summer Paralympics
1996
Summer Paralympics